Kirk in Copenhagen is a live album by jazz multi-instrumentalist Roland Kirk recorded in October 1963 at the Club Monmartre in Copenhagen, Denmark. It was originally released on the Mercury label in 1963 and features performances by Kirk with Tete Montoliu, Niels-Henning Ørsted Pedersen, Don Moore and J.C. Moses and a guest appearance by Sonny Boy Williamson, credited as "Big Skol".

Critical reception
The AllMusic review by Lindsay Planer and Thom Jurek states: "Although somewhat ragtag in derivation, the combo quickly finds its sonic niche... providing Kirk plenty of space to improvise wildly, utilizing his clever wit and immensely expressive musicality".

Track listing
All compositions by Roland Kirk except where noted.''
 "Narrow Bolero" - 5:23
 "Mingus-Griff Song" - 8:07
 "The Monkey Thing" - 5:43
 "Mood Indigo" (Barney Bigard, Duke Ellington, Irving Mills) - 7:17
 "Cabin in the Sky" (Vernon Duke, John Latouche) - 7:46
 "On the Corner of King and Scott Streets" - 4:12

Personnel
Roland Kirk – tenor saxophone, manzello, stritch, flute, siren
Tete Montoliu – piano
Niels-Henning Ørsted Pedersen – bass 
J.C. Moses – drums 
Don Moore – bass 
Big Skol – harmonica (track 3)

References

Rahsaan Roland Kirk live albums
1964 live albums
Mercury Records live albums
Live instrumental albums
1963 in Denmark
Albums recorded at Jazzhus Montmartre